Nino Aleksi-Meskhishvili (1896, Tbilisi – 16 May 1956, Moscow) was a Georgian stage actor. She graduated from the Moscow State Pedagogical University in 1914. She worked in Russia (1914-1920, 1922–1925), Kiev (1920-1922), and for the Rustaveli Theatre in Tbilisi (1926-1928).

See also
 Barbara Aleksi-Meskhishvili

References

1896 births
1956 deaths
Actors from Tbilisi
Moscow State Pedagogical University alumni